Preyah-Eyrin-Comfort Rex Osassey (born 22 September 1994), known professionally as Preyah, is a Bulgarian singer and songwriter that first became known through her features on songs by Grafa, Billy Hlapeto and Mihaela Fileva.

Early life

Preyah was born in Sofia in 1994 to a Bulgarian mother and a Nigerian father, who died when she was a child. Her mother Sabina worked in Cyprus when Preyah was 13 years old, so they could pay the mortgage on their apartment.

Career

Early career
Preyah was part of a vocal group in her childhood. In 2011 she appeared on the first season of Bulgarian X Factor, but only made it through the boot camp stage. 
In 2013 she joined the Music Academy show, where she was eliminated in the semifinals, though the producers of the show Monte Music offered her a contract nevertheless.

2013–2018: Debut single and Monte Music releases

Preyah's debut single with Billy Hlapeto Malkite Neshta was released in 2014 and immediately became the most played video on Bulgarian TV in its debut week. The song was originally recorded as Guilty Pleasure Store, and had been previously performed by Preyah with Smooth during the 2012 Spirit of Burgas festival. Her first individual single was Nyuansi, completed in early 2015.

2018–present: Solo album and indie career

Discography

References

External links
 
 
 

1994 births
Living people
Musicians from Sofia
21st-century Bulgarian women singers
Bulgarian pop singers
Bulgarian people of Nigerian descent
X Factor (Bulgarian TV series)